Diplacus longiflorus (syn. Mimulus longiflorus), commonly known as southern bush monkeyflower, is a species of monkeyflower native to southwestern California (United States) and Baja California Norte (Mexico).

References

longiflorus
Flora of North America